Eight ships of the Royal Navy have borne the name HMS Seagull or HMS Sea Gull, after the gull:

  was a 16-gun brig-sloop that disappeared in the English Channel in February 1805.
  was a 16-gun  that the Danes captured in 1808; she sank but the Danes recovered her and returned her to service. After the separation of Norway from Denmark, she transferred to the Norwegian Navy, which decommissioned her in 1817.
  was a 16-gun brig-sloop, formerly the French Sylphe. The Royal Navy captured her in 1808 and sold her in 1814.
  was a 12-gun schooner broken up in 1856.
  was an  wooden screw gunboat sold in 1864.
  was a  sold in 1887.
  was a  converted to a minesweeper in 1909 and was sunk in a collision in 1918.
  was a  launched in 1937. She became a survey ship in 1945 and was broken up in 1956.

Other Seagulls in Royal Navy service

 1796: When the British captured Demerara, they captured, among other vessels, a 12-gun cutter, Zeemeeuw (Seagull), which they took into service as Seagull and put under the command of a Lieutenant Lloyd; she apparently foundered soon after. She was possibly the 8th Charter Zeemeeuw, built at Zeeland and launched c.1781 that disappears from the Dutch records in 1796. Her dimensions, in Dutch feet of 11 Rotterdam inches, were 58'½ x 20' x 7' 7/11".

See also
 Revenue cutters Seagull and Fox captured the French privateer Friedland on 15 October 1807. Friedland was armed with two guns and small arms, and had a crew of 35 men. She was two days out of Cherbourg and had made no captures. The revenue cutters took her into Cowes.  
 There may have been a HM Revenue cutter Seagull launched in 1814 and in service until 1825.

Notes, citations, and references

Notes

Citations

References

Hepper, David J. (1994) British Warship Losses in the Age of Sail, 1650-1859. (Rotherfield: Jean Boudriot). 
van Maanen, Ron, Preliminary list of Dutch naval vessel built or required in the period 1700-1799. Unpublished manuscript.

Royal Navy ship names